Pleasant Hill Consolidated School, also known as Pleasant Hill Middle School and Carvers Bay School, is a historic school complex located near Hemingway, Georgetown County, South Carolina. It was built about 1938, and consists of three one-story brick buildings connected by two covered walkways. The three buildings were the grammar school, auditorium/gymnasium (central block), and high school. Both schools are "U"-shaped. The cannery and home economics/farm-shop buildings are located behind the high school.

It was listed on the National Register of Historic Places in 1998.

References 

School buildings on the National Register of Historic Places in South Carolina
School buildings completed in 1938
National Register of Historic Places in Georgetown County, South Carolina
Schools in Georgetown County, South Carolina